Pete Kwiatkowski (born August 29, 1966) is an American football coach, currently the defensive coordinator at the University of Texas at Austin.  He was previously the defensive coordinator at the University of Washington, and at Boise State University, where he played in the mid-1980s.

Playing career
Kwiatkowski played college football at Boise State as a defensive lineman from 1984 to 1987, where he was a first-team All-American (Division I-AA) in 1987. He was an honorable mention All-America recognition from the Associated Press in 1986, Big Sky defensive player of the year in 1987, first-team All-Big Sky (1986, 1987), and honorable mention as a sophomore in 1985.

Kwiatkowski was inducted into the Boise State Athletic Hall of Fame in 1996.

Coaching career

Early years
Kwiatkowski began his coaching career at Boise State in 1988, coaching a number of positions on defense including the defensive backs, outside linebackers, and the defensive line. After nine seasons with the Broncos, he was the co-defensive coordinator position at Snow College in Utah for one season (1997) and the defensive line coach at Eastern Washington in Cheney for two years

Montana State
Kwiatkowski moved to Montana State in 2000 and coordinated the Bobcats' defense for six seasons. While in Bozeman, his defenses were a league-best in yards allowed per game, passing defense, and scoring defense. In 2002, on the back of Kwiatkowski's defense the Bobcats earned a spot in the playoffs for the first time in

Boise State
Following a highly successful stretch in Bozeman, Kwiatkowski returned to Boise State in 2006 to coach the defensive line under recently promoted head coach   he was promoted to defensive coordinator and his unit finished second nationally in total defense; he stayed at BSU through 2013.

Washington
After the 2013 season, Kwiatkowski followed Petersen to Washington in Seattle. In his debut season as defensive coordinator for the Huskies in 2014, he coached three to  status, including the first unanimous All-American at Washington in 20 years: defensive end Hau'oli Kikaha. Four of Kwiatkowski's players were selected in the first two rounds of the 2015 NFL Draft, including three in the first round.

Texas
In January 2021, Kwiatkowski accepted an offer from new Longhorns head coach Steve Sarkisian to become the defensive coordinator for the Texas Longhorns. Kwiatkowski cited the 1978 Cotton Bowl Classic as a reason for being interested in the position, stating that he'd been interested in the Longhorns ever since he'd watched that game.

References

External links
 Washington profile
 Boise State profile
 Boise State Hall of Fame profile

Living people
American football defensive linemen
Boise State Broncos football coaches
Boise State Broncos football players
Eastern Washington Eagles football coaches
Montana State Bobcats football coaches
Snow Badgers football coaches
Texas Longhorns football coaches
Washington Huskies football coaches
1966 births